Hypersonix Launch Systems is an Australian space startup developing scramjet and scramjet-based access-to-space technology. In particular, the company is focused on reusable, "green-fuelled" launch technology. It's an aerospace engineering, design and build company specialising In hypersonic vehicle and scramjet engines to provide sustainable affordable access to space.

Details 

Hypersonix was founded in 2019. The company aims to commercialize scramjet technology similar to that developed at the University of Queensland's Centre for Hypersonics, during programs such as HIFiRE and Scramspace.

Test vehicle
To test and demonstrate its technologies, the company is building Delta-Velos, the minimum viable product, that will employ composite materials, is targeted to cover a range of 2500 km speed of Mach 12 and be reusable. It will be a small vehicle 5.5 m in length with a 2 m wingspan.

Engine
Spartan is Hypersonix's experimental scramjet engine. Using hydrogen as fuel and atmospheric air as oxidiser, the engine is described as having an operational range from Mach 5 to Mach 12, containing no moving parts and intended to power its satellite launch systems.

Launch system
In 2021 Hypersonix Launch Systems teamed up with the University of Southern Queensland to create a re-usable hypersonic UAV (unmanned aerial vehicle) to be named Delta Velos.

The proposed launch system called Delta-Velos Orbiter will use three stages:
 a rocket booster Boomerang, 0–20 km altitude, speeds 0 to Mach 5, returning to the launch site after deploying the wings;
 a winged scramjet glider, 20–40 km ascend with speed increasing from Mach 5 to Mach 8, also flying back to Earth and performing a landing;
 a third rocket stage 40 km to orbit;

all powered by green hydrogen, with the atmospheric flight of the stage two allowing for flexible routing and choice of the latitude. The payload capacity is only projected to be 50 kg to LEO SSO (microsatellies range).

Links 

 Official site

References 

Aerospace companies of Australia
Private spaceflight companies